Golconda is a census-designated place in southeastern Humboldt County, Nevada, United States. As of the 2010 census it had a population of 214. It is located along Interstate 80 on the Humboldt River in the northwestern part of the state. Golconda has a post office, which has been in operation since 1869.

History

Golconda was founded in 1869. The community was named for the ancient diamond mining center of Golkonda in India. The settlement had its start when discovery of copper, silver, gold, and lead brought entrepreneurs who opened mines and mills in the district. The town was a diverse society including both native-born European Americans as well as other groups including individuals of French, Portuguese, Paiute, and Chinese descent who all lived and worked in the small community. During 1898-1910, the town had a train depot, several hotels, a school, businesses, newspapers, and two brothels. Its population peaked at about six hundred in 1907-08. Although boosters predicted growth for Golconda, after 1910 the mines played out, leaving the region as an area of ranches and farms. Most of the town's buildings from its mining heyday are gone, and Golconda today is a minor stop on Interstate 80.

Geography
The Osgood Mountains lie across the Humboldt River to the north.

Demographics

See also

 Golconda Thrust

References

Census-designated places in Nevada
Census-designated places in Humboldt County, Nevada
Humboldt River